Hans-Jörg Unterrainer (born 15 April 1980) is an Austrian former snowboarder. He competed in the men's snowboard cross event at the 2006 Winter Olympics. He now works as a sommelier and chef.

References

External links
 

1980 births
Living people
Austrian chefs
Austrian male snowboarders
Olympic snowboarders of Austria
Snowboarders at the 2006 Winter Olympics
Sportspeople from Salzburg